Halah may refer to:

Given name 
 Halah (name), in Arabic and Hebrew
 Hala (given name)

Persons 
Halah binte Wahab, one of Abd al-Muttalib ibn Hashim's wives
Halah bint Khuwailid, the sister of Muhammad's first wife

Locations 
Halah, a city mentioned in the bible
 Halah Gheralta, a village in Addi Walka municipality in Ethiopia
 Halah, a village in Ayninbirkekin municipality in Ethiopia
 Halah Qush, a village in Iran

See also 
 Hala (disambiguation)